The Living Temple of God in Christ Jesus Fellowship or Living Temple Ministries or LTM is an Evangelical church based in the Philippines. With Two branches and still increasing, is located at Malabago, Mangaldan, Pangasinan.

History 
In 1985, Pastor Mario Batac and Co-pastors decided to put on a Come To Jesus Church branch in Dagupan City. Started with only a few members in an apartment in Tambac. And then, when their members are increasing, they looked for another place to accommodate the population of this church. From Tambac, they transferred to Nibaliw in Mangaldan. But soon, they separate and Pastor Mario Batac put on a church in the same town of Mangaldan in Barangay Malabago and name it Living Temple of God in Christ Jesus Fellowship.

References 

Evangelicalism in the Philippines
Churches in Pangasinan